St. John Paul II Catholic High School is a Catholic high school in Avondale, Arizona.

History
In 1998, the pastor of St. Thomas Aquinas parish lobbied the diocese to buy land for a future elementary and high school.

The diocese tapped the Dominican Sisters of St. Cecilia, known colloquially as the "Nashville Dominicans", to establish a presence in Phoenix and operate the new high school. Sr. Mary Jordan Hoover, O.P., previously the founding principal when the order built Saint John Paul the Great Catholic High School in northern Virginia, serves as the principal of JP2.

On April 21, 2015, the Roman Catholic Diocese of Phoenix announced plans to construct St. John Paul II Catholic High School in Avondale on diocesan property next to St. Thomas Aquinas parish.

Ground was broken for the new school at a ceremony on January 21, 2017. Later in the year, the diocese launched a $100 million capital campaign, "Together Let Us Go Forth". The largest grant of the funds to be raised from the program, $23 million, was earmarked for the new high school.

The  first phase, consisting of a three-story academic building and gymnasium, opened in August 2018, accepting 150 freshmen and sophomores, with about 40% of students coming from public schools. It was the second diocesan high school to open west of Interstate 17. John Paul II was the second Catholic high school in the diocese to use a "house" system, in which each student is assigned to one of six houses.

In March 2019, Bishop Thomas Olmsted dedicated the new chapel altar, which features a relic: a lock of hair of Saint John Paul II.

Athletics

The JP2 girls basketball team won the Canyon Athletic Association state title in its first year, with the school moving into the larger Arizona Interscholastic Association for 2019–20.

References

Schools in Maricopa County, Arizona
Catholic secondary schools in Arizona
2018 establishments in Arizona
Catholic Church in Arizona
Educational institutions established in 2018
Avondale, Arizona